The 1991 Hindu Kush earthquake occurred northeast of Kabul, Afghanistan on February 1, 1991. It was an intermediate-depth earthquake with a hypocenter 142.4 km beneath the Hindu Kush mountains. It measured 6.9 on the moment magnitude scale, and affected neighbouring Pakistan and the USSR. At least 848 people were killed in both countries and damage was estimated at $26 million USD ($53.2 million in 2022).

Background
The Afghanistan-Pakistan-Tajikistan border region lies within the broad zone of ongoing crustal deformation caused by continental collision between the Indian Plate and the Eurasian Plate. The area is seismically active, particularly as a result of faulting at just over 200 km depth within the downgoing slab, producing intraplate earthquakes. Many large greater than magnitude 7.0 have been observed in the Hindu Kush, all with similar epicenters, with an approximate periodicity of about 10–15 years. These events have reverse fault focal mechanisms, which for the near-vertical slab indicates active extension. It has been proposed that these earthquakes are a result of "necking" of the downgoing slab, a process that may eventually lead to break-off.

Smaller shallow focus earthquakes are also observed in the region, particularly associated with north–south trending zones of right lateral strike-slip, such as the Chaman Fault, with an increasing degree of shortening to the north, together accommodating the highly oblique convergence between the Indian Plate and the Eurasian Plate.

Damage and casualties
An estimated 545 people died in Afghanistan's Konar, Nangarhar and Badakhshan provinces when homes were destroyed. Another 300 people died in Azad Kashmir, Pakistan. The high death toll was attributed to the collapse of poorly-constructed homes when its residents were asleep. Thousands of houses in Malakand, Chitral, and Peshawar suffered severe damage. A lawless tribal area of Pakistan near the Afghanistan border was affected. The same area was devastated by a civil war which had been ongoing 12 years prior. At least 300 homes in the mountainous village of Arandu were destroyed. Other villages were buried under landslides. Most homes in the area were constructed of straw and mud, which were razed. In Islamabad, windows rattled for a minute, causing panic among residents. Doctors in Lahore said that at least 10 people experienced heart attacks. Three people died from heart attacks in Khorog, Tajikistan. Landslides were also observed. According to TASS, a Soviet-owned news agency, it was strongly felt in Uzbekistan and Tajikistan. In Tajikistan, landslides were triggered, and communications, power, transportation and residencial infrastructures were destroyed. Snow, rockslides and avalanches made accessibility to the area impossible.

See also
List of earthquakes in Afghanistan
List of earthquakes in Pakistan

References

1991 earthquakes
Earthquakes in Afghanistan
Earthquakes in Pakistan
Earthquakes in Tajikistan
1991 in Afghanistan
1991 in Pakistan
1991 in Tajikistan